The IFSC Climbing World Cup is a series of climbing competitions held annually and organized by the International Federation of Sport Climbing (IFSC). The athletes compete in three disciplines: lead, bouldering and speed. The number of competitions and venues vary from year to year. The first World Cup was held in 1989, and included only lead climbing events. Speed climbing was introduced in 1998 and bouldering in 1999. For 18 seasons, from 1989 to 2006, World Cups were held under the auspices of UIAA and called UIAA Climbing World Cups. Since 2007, they have been held under the auspices of the IFSC.

Scoring system

Individual disciplines 
At the end of each World Cup competition, a trophy is awarded to the winner, the top three athletes are awarded gold, bronze, and silver medals, and the top six athletes are awarded prize money.
The top 40 competitors of individual World Cup competitions are eligible to accrue points.

For each discipline (lead, bouldering and speed), the points awarded to each athlete are added together throughout the World Cup series in order to determine an overall World Cup ranking. If an athlete participates in all competitions in a discipline, their worst result is discarded (provided that IFSC organizes at least 6 competitions for that season). At the end of the season, the athlete with highest ranking in each discipline will be considered to be the overall winner of the World Cup series, and will be awarded a trophy. The athletes ranking second and third will be awarded a plate.

National team ranking 
At the end of each competition, a national team ranking is determined, for each discipline, by adding the ranking points of the three highest ranked individual team members. For each discipline (lead, bouldering and speed), the points awarded to each team are added together throughout the World Cup series in order to determine the overall team ranking. If a team participates in all competitions in a discipline, its worst result is discarded (provided that IFSC organizes at least 6 competitions for that season). At the end of the season, the team with highest overall ranking is awarded a trophy.

Combined ranking 

For each season, results obtained by each athlete across events and across disciplines (Lead, Bouldering and Speed) are considered to determine a combined ranking. At the end of the season, prizes are awarded to the top three athletes. The combined title was first introduced in 1998, together with the first speed event. Bouldering was introduced in the following year.

From 1998 to 2017, the combined score for each athlete was obtained by adding together the overall World Cup scores obtained by that athlete in at least two different disciplines. For instance, in 2017 Janja Garnbret won the combined title with a combined score of 1135 points, which was the sum of the overall scores she obtained in Lead and Bouldering. Since she competed in no Speed event, her score in that discipline was zero.

Since 2018, more complex rules were applied to determine the combined score. Only athletes participating in at least two competitions in each discipline (i.e. 2 in Bouldering, 2 in Lead, and 2 in Speed) were eligible for the combined title. For each World Cup event, rankings were adjusted by discarding non-eligible athletes. Since they were relative to a selected subset of athletes (the eligible ones), these adjusted rankings were called relative rankings, as opposed to the general rankings applied to the whole set of participants. If an eligible athlete participated in more than two competitions in a discipline, only the best two results in that discipline were considered. For each eligible athlete, the relative rankings obtained in the selected six events were multiplied together to determine a combined score. Athletes were ranked according to their combined score in ascending order. Namely, the athlete with the lowest score was awarded the combined title. For instance, in 2018 Jakob Schubert won the Combined World Cup with a score of 48 points, determined as shown in the table.

In 2019, individual combined events were introduced in the World Cup series, where participants are required to compete in all disciplines (Bouldering, Lead and Speed) and medals are awarded based on their combined results. Nevertheless, at the end of the season, combined World Cup rankings will be determined as well, with the same method applied in 2018, based on results across disciplines obtained by each athlete in six selected events.

Men's results 
Complete rankings starting from the 1991 season are available on the IFSC web site.

Lead

Bouldering

Speed

Combined

Women's results 
Complete rankings starting from the 1991 season are available on the IFSC web site.

Lead

Bouldering

Speed

Combined

See also 

 International Federation of Sport Climbing
 IFSC Climbing World Championships
 IFSC Climbing European Championships
 IFSC Climbing Asian Championships
 List of best IFSC results

References

External links 
 
 
 

 
Climbing competitions
Sports competition series
World cups
IFSC Climbing World Cup overall medalists